Trichomycterus alternatus is a species of pencil catfish endemic to Brazil, where it occurs in coastal river basins in Rio de Janeiro and Espírito Santo.

References

External links

alternatus
Fish of South America
Fish of Brazil
Endemic fauna of Brazil
Fish described in 1917